The Tony Award for Best Musical is given annually to the best new Broadway musical, as determined by Tony Award voters. The award is one of the ceremony's longest-standing awards, having been presented each year since 1949. The award goes to the producers of the winning musical. A musical is eligible for consideration in a given year if it has not previously been produced on Broadway and is not "determined... to be a 'classic' or in the historical or popular repertoire", otherwise it may be considered for Best Revival of a Musical.

Best Musical is the final award presented at the Tony Awards ceremony. Excerpts from the musicals that are nominated for this award are usually performed during the ceremony before this award is presented.

This is a list of winners and nominations for the Tony Award for Best Musical.

Winners and nominees
†indicates the winner of the Pulitzer Prize for Drama

*indicates a finalist of the Pulitzer Prize for Drama

1940s

1950s

1960s

1970s

1980s

1990s

2000s

2010s

2020s

Records
Accumulated records as of 2022:
 The Producers has won the most Tonys, winning in 12 categories, including Best Musical. 
 Hamilton is the most-nominated production in Tony history, with 16 nominations.
 The Sound of Music and Fiorello! are the only two musicals to date to have ever tied for the Best Musical award (in 1960).
 Passion is the shortest-running winner, with 280 performances. (If preview performances are included, then that distinction belongs to Hallelujah, Baby!)
 The Phantom of the Opera is the longest-running Best Musical winner, with 16 previews and 13,589 performances as of 2022.
 Hallelujah, Baby! is the only show thus far to have won the Tony Award for Best Musical after closing.
 Kiss Me, Kate and Titanic are the only two shows to win the Tony Award for Best Musical without any Tony nominations in the acting categories. (In Kiss Me, Kate'''s case, only winners were announced that year, and only in the lead performance categories.)
 Two Gentlemen of Verona (1972), Raisin (1974), 42nd Street (1981) and A Strange Loop (2022) won Best Musical and only one other Tony Award.
 What is now the Richard Rodgers Theatre has housed more Best Musical winners than any other theater on Broadway: Guys and Dolls (1951), Damn Yankees (1956), Redhead (1959), How to Succeed in Business Without Really Trying (1962), 1776 (1969), Raisin (1974), Nine (1982), In the Heights (2008), and Hamilton (2016).The Mystery of Edwin Drood was the first winner of the Tony Award for Best Musical to be entirely written by one man, Rupert Holmes. Rent (by Jonathan Larson), Hamilton (by Lin-Manuel Miranda), and A Strange Loop (by Michael R. Jackson) also achieved this feat. Hadestown is the first musical entirely written by one woman, Anaïs Mitchell, to win this award.
 Fun Home'' was the first musical written entirely by a team of women to win the Tony Award for Best Musical.
 The 74th Tony Awards (2020) is the first ceremony in which only jukebox musicals were nominated.

See also
 Tony Award for Best Revival of a Musical
 Drama Desk Award for Outstanding Musical
 Laurence Olivier Award for Best New Musical
 List of Tony Award and Olivier Award winning musicals

References

External links
 Tony Awards Official site
 Tony Awards at Internet Broadway database Listing
 Internet Broadway Database, See Awards
 Tony Awards at broadwayworld.com

 
Tony Awards
Musical theatre awards
Awards established in 1949
1949 establishments in the United States